"Barn Burning" is a short story by the American author William Faulkner which first appeared in Harper's in June 1939 (pp. 86–96) and has since been widely anthologized. The story deals with class conflicts, the influence of fathers, and vengeance as viewed through the third-person perspective of a young, impressionable child. It precedes The Hamlet, The Town, and The Mansion, the three novels that make up Faulkner's Snopes trilogy.

It was reprinted in A Rose for Emily and Other Stories, Collected Stories of William Faulkner, The Faulkner Reader, and Selected Short Stories of William Faulkner.

Characters
 Colonel Sartoris Snopes ("Sarty") – protagonist
 Abner Snopes – patriarch of the Snopes family, personal hobby of burning barns, antagonist
 Lennie Snopes – wife of Abner and mother of Sarty
 Lizzie – unmarried sister of Lennie Snopes
 Major de Spain – Snopes's employer who Sarty warns about the barn burning
 Mr. Harris – Abner's first mentioned landowner
 Colonel John Snopes – Sarty's brother
 Sarty's two "bovine" sisters

Synopsis
"Barn Burning" (set in about 1895) opens in a country drug store, which is doubling as a Justice of the Peace Court. A hungry boy named Sarty craves the stew and bread in the store. He is afraid. His father, Abner Snopes, is in court, accused of burning down Mr. Harris's barn. Sarty is called up to testify against his father, and he knows that he is going to have to lie and say his father did not burn the barn. The Justice and Mr. Harris realize they are putting the young boy in a bad position, and they let him off the hook. The judge tells Mr. Snopes to leave the county and never come back.

As Sarty leaves the courthouse, a kid calls him "Barn Burner!" and knocks him down, twice. Sarty tries to chase the kid but his father stops him. Sarty, his older brother, and his father get into the family wagon, where his mother, aunt, and two sisters are waiting. The wagon is already loaded with their broken possessions. That night, the family camps. After Sarty falls asleep, his father wakes him up and tells Sarty to follow him. Sarty does. His father accuses him of being on the verge of betraying him in court. He hits Sarty. Then he tells him that the most important thing is to stand by one's family.

The next day the Snopes family arrives at their new home, a shack on the farm where they will be working as tenant farmers. Abner wants to talk to the owner and he takes Sarty with him. When Sarty sees the owner's fancy, white mansion he feels like everything just might be all right after all. He thinks his father can not possibly hurt people who live in a house like that. On the way to the front door, Sarty notices that Abner deliberately steps in some fresh horse excrement. At the front door, a "House Negro" greets them and tells Snopes to wipe off his boots. In defiance of the request for politeness, Snopes pushes past with a racial insult and tracks the excrement all over the white rug in the front room.  

Later that day, the owner of the rug and mansion, Mr. de Spain, has the rug dropped off at Abner's shack. Abner sets his two daughters to cleaning it, and then dries it in front of the fire. Abner then damages on the rug with a flattish rock. Early the next morning, Abner wakes Sarty and the two of them return the rug to de Spain. De Spain shows up shortly after, insulting Abner and complaining that the rug is "ruined". He tells Abner that he is going to charge him twenty extra bushels of corn to pay for the hundred-dollar rug. When he leaves, Sarty tells Abner that they should not give de Spain any corn at all.

After working hard all week, Sarty goes with his family to town that Saturday. He goes with his father into a store, and sees that a Justice of the Peace Court is in session. De Spain is there. Sarty does not realize that Abner is suing de Spain to have the fee of twenty bushels reduced. Sarty blurts out that his father is not guilty of burning any barns making the Justice think the rug was also burned. Abner sends him back to the wagon, but he stays in the store to see what happens.

The Justice decides that Abner is responsible for the damage to the rug, but he reduces the fee to ten bushels. Sarty, his father, and his brother spend some time in town and do not go home until the sun has almost set. After dinner, Sarty hears his mother trying to stop his father from doing something. He realizes his father is planning to burn the de Spain barn. His father and brother realize that Sarty is planning on alerting de Spain, and they leave him behind, held tight in his mother's arms.

Sarty breaks free and runs to the de Spain house. He is only able to say "Barn!" a few times, and then he is on the run again. De Spain is right behind him, about to run him over. Sarty jumps into a ditch and then returns to the road. He hears three gunshots soon after.

At midnight Sarty is on top of a hill. He has come a long way. Everything is behind him. He mourns the loss of his father (who he seems to assume is dead), but is no longer afraid. He falls asleep and feels better when he wakes up. The whippoorwills are singing and it's almost morning. He starts walking toward the woods in front of him. He does not turn around.

Adaptations

In 1954, Gore Vidal adapted "Barn Burning" into an episode of the same name for the CBS anthology series Suspense, starring E. G. Marshall.

In 1958, Martin Ritt directed a film titled The Long, Hot Summer featuring actor Paul Newman. This film was based on three of Faulkner's works including "Barn Burning." In 1985, a made-for-television remake of The Long, Hot Summer aired on NBC, starring Don Johnson.

In 1980, the story was adapted into a PBS short film of the same name by director Peter Werner. It starred Tommy Lee Jones as Abner Snopes, Shawn Whittington as Sartoris Snopes, and Faulkner's nephew as De Spain.

The 1995 Malaysian adaptation titled The Arsonist (Malay: Kaki Bakar) was made by director U-Wei Haji Saari. The Snopes family being post-Civil War farmers are instead rewritten as Javanese immigrants who had just moved into a new rubber plantation.

The 2018 South Korean film Burning performs a stylistic adaptation merging elements of the Faulkner story with the Haruki Murakami story of the same name.

References

External links
 
 
"Barn Burning" at Digital Yoknapatawpha

1939 short stories
Short stories adapted into films
Short stories by William Faulkner
Third-person narrative fiction
Works originally published in Harper's Magazine